The following is a list and biographical sketch of notable euphonists from around the world:

See also

Lists of musicians

References

External links

Lists of musicians by instrument